Gion Schnyder (born 1986) is a Swiss orienteering and ski orienteering competitor.

He won a bronze medal in the middle distance at the 2019 World Ski Orienteering Championships.

References

1986 births
Living people
Swiss orienteers
Ski-orienteers